Hatta is an inland exclave of the emirate of Dubai in the United Arab Emirates. Formerly an Omani territory, its ownership was transferred to Dubai in or around 1850.

Geography 
It is located relatively high in the Hajar Mountains. It borders Oman to the east and the south, the Ajman exclave of Masfout to the west, and Ras al-Khaimah to the north.

History 
Previously known as Hajarain,  Hatta became a dependency of Dubai during the reign of Hasher Bin Maktoum after the Omani Sultan Turki bin Said transferred the territory, finding himself unable to defend it against the Na'im of Buraimi, who had settled neighbouring Masfout (today a part of the emirate of Ajman). The village was still called Hajarain as recently as 1906.

The old village of Hatta includes two prominent military towers from the 1880s, a fort from 1896 and the Juma mosque, which was built in 1780 and is the oldest building in Hatta. Some ancestral burial chambers from the Hafit period (3200-2500BC) can be found in the east part of the village. Some of them have been completely rebuilt. The traditional water supply was through the falaj system, which also has been restored.  Since it is located in the mountains, traditionally it was the summer habitation of Dubai-based families escaping the heat and humidity of the coast and trying new outdoor activities.

Since the early 1980s, Hatta has been a popular vacation destination for western expatriates and local families alike for 'wadi bashing' through the tracks between Hatta, Mahdah and Al Ain.

Economy 
Hatta's main economic factor is tourism and water. Historically the area was able to grow date palms; the fruits were used as a food source, while the tree was used for building material.

Hatta Dam was built in 1990s to supply the area with electricity and water. Hatta Kayak is a popular tourist destination and a favourite spot for kayaking in UAE.

Development 
In November 8, 2016, Mohammed Bin Rashid announced a 1.3AED billion plan to turn the mountain city of Hatta into a world-class tourist destination, with over 40 projects in economic, social and cultural sectors. The plan included 400 homes for Emiratis in Hatta, green areas for winter sports and a mountain track circuit. The plan aims to encourage the youth to start their own business businesses under the supervision of the Mohammed bin Rashid Foundation.

Sports 
It is home to football side Hatta Club. Since 2009, the Dubai Sports Council has been focusing on reviving Hatta with sports and outdoor activities, such as hiking, yoga, rowing, paddling, and kayaking, to associate the area with such activities.

It also has a network of mountain biking routes of various grades that cater for beginners, intermediate and advanced cyclists.

Climate 
Due to Hatta's higher altitude, its climate is much cooler than central Dubai. Hatta has an arid landscape and temperature, reaching 55 degrees Celsius in the summer; however, it is less humid than Dubai and far colder in the winter.

Gallery

References

External links

 
 

Populated places in Dubai
Enclaves and exclaves
Cities in the United Arab Emirates